Parmena cruciata is a species of beetle in the family Cerambycidae. It was described by Maurice Pic in 1912. It is known from Spain.

References

Parmenini
Beetles described in 1912